Inga amboroensis is a species of plant in the family Fabaceae. It is found only in Bolivia.

References

amboroensis
Flora of Bolivia
Vulnerable plants
Taxonomy articles created by Polbot